Todd W. Eddins (born  1964/1965) is an Associate Justice of the Hawaii Supreme Court and a former Judge of the O'ahu First Circuit Court of Hawaii.

Education
Eddins received his Bachelor of Business Administration from the College of William & Mary in 1986 and he received his Juris Doctor from the William S. Richardson School of Law at the University of Hawaiʻi at Mānoa in 1991. While attending law school, Eddins was Executive Editor of the University of Hawaii Law Review.

Legal career
After graduating law school, he served as a law clerk for Justice Yoshimi Hayashi of the Hawaii Supreme Court. He later served as a deputy public defender from 1992–2004. He served in private practice from 2004–2010 and again from 2013–2017.

Judicial career

Circuit Court
Eddins was considered on multiple occasions as a potential nominee for a circuit court vacancy, he was considered as a replacement due to the retirement of Judge Steven Alm in August 2016, and as a replacement due to the retirement of Judge Karen Ahn in June 2016. On February 9, 2017, Governor David Ige appointed Eddins to be a Circuit Judge of the First Circuit Court to fill the vacancy left by the retirement of Richard K. Perkins in June 2016. Eddins became a Circuit Judge on April 7, 2017. His service on the Circuit Court terminated when he was sworn in as an associate justice of the Hawaii Supreme Court.

Hawaii Supreme Court
On September 29, 2020, Governor David Ige's office announced Eddins was one of three candidates being considered for appointment to the Hawaii Supreme Court. On October 23, 2020, Governor David Ige announced Eddins as his appointment to the Hawaii Supreme Court to fill the vacancy left by the retirement of Richard W. Pollack. On November 19, 2020, he was confirmed in the Hawaii Senate by a vote of 25–0. He was sworn in on December 11, 2020.

References

External links

1960s births
Living people
Place of birth missing (living people)
20th-century American lawyers
21st-century American judges
21st-century American lawyers
College of William & Mary alumni
Hawaii lawyers
Hawaii state court judges
Justices of the Hawaii Supreme Court
Public defenders
William S. Richardson School of Law alumni